Garra robertsi is a species of cyprinid fish in the genus Garra found in the Sungai Bongan and Tempassuk Rivers in Sabah Borneo.

References 

Garra
Fish described in 2015